"Bad Boys" is a song by Australian band Roxus. The song was released in July 1991 as the second single from their debut studio album Nightstreet (1991). The song peaked at number 39 on the Australian ARIA Chart.

Track listing
 Vinyl / 7" single (K11016)
 "Bad Boys" - 2:57	
 "Bad Boys" (Live) - 2:40	
 "All Right Now" (Live) - 5:13

Chart performance

References

External links
 "Bad Boys" by Roxus

1991 singles
1991 songs
Roxus songs
Song recordings produced by Mark Opitz